Batley Carr, West Yorkshire, England is a district partly in Dewsbury and partly in Batley, on the way to Dewsbury, along the A652, Bradford Road. Historically part of the West Riding of Yorkshire, the population is about 3,740. Crime is around the national average.

Batley Carr housed the workers from the mills of Dewsbury, Batley and Batley Carr. As the settlement expanded, with the growth of textiles, there was a necessity for its own railway station (Staincliffe and Batley Carr railway station). The red brick station master's house still stands but is now a private residence.

However, Batley Carr has since dwindled in size and now only has a post office, a few shops (mainly takeaways) and some remaining factories including the British Beds haulage depot. It is near the nightclub 'The Frontier'. Public houses and working men's clubs are still popular.

Shannon Matthews, who disappeared from Dewsbury Moor on 19 February 2008, was found alive on 14 March 2008 in Lidgate Gardens, Batley Carr.

Notable people
Horace Waller, recipient of the Victoria Cross
Cardinal Arthur Roche, Prefect of the Dicastery for Divine Worship and the Discipline of the Sacraments and ninth Roman Catholic Bishop of Leeds

References

Heavy Woollen District
Geography of Batley